"Strawberry Sex" is a single written by J-Pop singer Ken Hirai's . It was released on May 22, 2002 under the label DefSTAR Records. Strawberry Sex is the first track on Ken's 5th studio album, Life Is....

"Strawberry Sex" was featured as the commercial song for the Honda That's car and was also performed in his concert tour.

Track list
Strawberry Sex (4:29)
Written and Composed by Ken Hirai and Taku Tada. Arranged by Masahito Nakano.
Ex-girlfriend (4:16)
Written by Ken Hirai. Composed and Arranged by Shinichiro Murayama.
Missin' You: It Will Break My Heart (remix Ascended) (6:54)
Written by Ken Hirai. Composed by Babyface. Remixed by Nanae Mimura.
Strawberry Sex (less vocal)

Ken Hirai songs
2002 singles
Songs written by Ken Hirai
Defstar Records singles
2002 songs